The fifth American Basketball Association All-Star Game was played January 29, 1972 at Freedom Hall in Louisville, Kentucky before an audience at 15,738. Joe Mullaney of the Kentucky Colonels coached the East, with LaDell Andersen of the Utah Stars coached the West.

Jim McDaniels scored 18 of his 24 points in the East's 45 point fourth quarter.  Dan Issel of the Kentucky Colonels was named MVP.

Western Conference

Eastern Conference
 

Halftime — West, 66-65
Third Quarter — East, 97-89
Officials: John Vanak and Bob Serafin
Attendance: 15,738.

References

External links
 ABA All Star Game at RemembertheABA.com

All-Star
ABA All-Star Game
ABA All-star game
Basketball competitions in Louisville, Kentucky